This page shows the Kyrgyzstan national football team's results in International Matches, as recognized by FIFA:

Overview of results

International Matches

1992–1999

1994

1996

1997

1999

2000–2009

2000

2001

2003

2004

2006

2007

2008

2009

2010–2019

2010

2011

2012

2013

2014

2015

2016

2017

2018

2019

2020–2029

2020

2021

2022

Non-International matches

Record versus other countries

International Goalscorers
All goalscorers from International Matches.

15 goals

Mirlan Murzayev 

12 goals

Anton Zemlianukhin

8 goals

Vitalij Lux

6 goals

Tursunali Rustamov

4 goals

Azamat Baymatov
Edgar Bernhardt
Alimardon Shukurov

3 goals

Gulzhigit Alykulov
Sergey Chikishev 
Cholponbek Esenkul Uulu
Farhat Haitbaev
Ruslan Jamshidov
Vadim Kharchenko 
Sergey Kutsov
Bekzhan Sagynbaev
David Tetteh 
Zamirbek Zhumagulov 

2 goals

Ildar Amirov
Evgeny Boldygin
Vladimir Chertkov 
Bakhtiyar Duyshobekov
Azamat Ishenbayev
Akhlidin Israilov
Valery Kichin 
Ilia Kovalenko
Andrey Krasnov
Tamirlan Kozubaev
Khurshit Lutfullayev
Aleksandr Merzlikin
Farkhat Musabekov
Vyacheslav Pryanishnikov
Rustem Usanov 
Kairat Zhyrgalbek Uulu

1 goals

Odilzhon Abdurakhmanov
Roman Ablakimov
Ayzar Akmatov
Vyacheslav Amin
Azim Azarov
Ernist Batyrkanov
Atabek Berdaly 
Valeriy Berezovskiy
Abay Bokoleyev
Aibek Bokoyev
Sergei Ivanov 
Timur Kadyrov
Emil Kenjisariev
Roman Kornilov 
Alexandr Korzanov
Kudrenko 
Viktor Maier
Bakyt Mamatov
Eldar Moldozhunusov
Aleksey Rybakov
Talant Samsaliev
Kanat Sardarov
Igor Sergeyev 
Islam Shamshiev
Kayumzhan Sharipov
Aziz Sydykov
Ruslan Sydykov
Vladimir Verevkin
Rafik Yusupov
Nematjan Zakirov

Own goal

Ali Diab (Syria)
Assad Abdul Ghani (Maldives)

References

External links

Results